Phelps Country Estate is a historic estate developed between about 1900 and 1904 and located near Carthage, Jasper County, Missouri.   The main house is a large two-story, eclectic Late Victorian style dwelling constructed of locally quarried Carthage marble.  It has a red tile hipped roof and features a wraparound verandah.  Also on the property are the contributing well house, caretaker's cottage, carriage house, workshop, silo, and large barn.

It was listed on the National Register of Historic Places in 1983.

References

Houses on the National Register of Historic Places in Missouri
Victorian architecture in Missouri
Houses completed in 1904
Buildings and structures in Jasper County, Missouri
National Register of Historic Places in Jasper County, Missouri